William T. Whyte (April 10, 1860 – May 16, 1911) was an American pre-Negro league pitcher in the late 1800s.

A native of Bristol, Rhode Island, Whyte spent most of his professional career with the Cuban Giants. In 1890, he posted an 11–5 record with a 3.02 ERA for the York Monarchs. Whyte died in Trenton, New Jersey in 1911 at age 51.

References

External links
  and Seamheads

1860 births
1911 deaths
Cuban Giants players
People from Bristol, Rhode Island
20th-century African-American people
Baseball pitchers